Pierre Mareschal is a French cinematographer for television.

Selected filmography

References

External links

Living people
French cinematographers
Year of birth missing (living people)